The men's ISSF 25 meter rapid fire pistol was a shooting sports event held as part of the shooting at the 1956 Summer Olympics programme. It was the 10th appearance of the event. The competition was held on 4 and 5 December 1956 at the shooting ranges in Melbourne. 35 shooters from 22 nations competed. Nations had been limited to two shooters each since 1952. The event was won by Ștefan Petrescu of Romania, the nation's first victory in the event. His countryman Gheorghe Lichiardopol repeated as bronze medalist, becoming the third man to win multiple rapid fire pistol medals. Between the two Romanians was Yevgeny Cherkasov with silver, earning the Soviet Union's first medal in the event.

Background

This was the 10th appearance of what had been standardised in 1948 as the men's ISSF 25 meter rapid fire pistol event, the only event on the 2020 programme that traces back to 1896. The event has been held at every Summer Olympics except 1904 and 1928 (when no shooting events were held) and 1908; it was nominally open to women from 1968 to 1980, although very few women participated these years. There is no women's equivalent on the Olympic programme, as of 2021. The first five events were quite different, with some level of consistency finally beginning with the 1932 event—which, though it had differences from the 1924 competition, was roughly similar. The 1936 competition followed the 1932 one quite closely. The post-World War II event substantially altered the competition once again.

Five of the top 10 shooters from 1952 returned: two-time gold medalist Károly Takács of Hungary, silver medalist Szilárd Kun of Hungary, bronze medalist Gheorghe Lichiardopol of Romania, fifth-place finisher Pentti Linnosvuo of Finland, and tenth-place finisher Oscar Cervo of Argentina. The reigning world champion was Soviet Nikolai Kalinichenko, who was not competing; second-place American William McMillan was also absent (failing to make the U.S. Olympic team after equipment failure at the trials), but third-place Finn Pentti Linnosvuo was in Melbourne.

Australia, Colombia, Indonesia, and Japan each made their debut in the event. The United States made its eighth appearance in the event, most of any nation.

Competition format

The competition format followed the 1948 format, now very close to the modern rapid fire pistol competition after significant variation before World War II. Each shooter fired 60 shots. These were done in two courses of 30; each course consisted of two stages of 15; each stage consisted of three series of 5. In each stage, the time limit for each series was 8 seconds for the first, 6 seconds for the second, and 4 seconds for the third. 

A holdover from the previous Games was that full-body silhouettes, rather than round targets, continued to be used; however, scoring rings had been added so that now each shot was scored up to 10 rather than being strictly hit or miss. Hits were the primary measurement of success; points were only used to differentiate between shooters with the same number of hits. Ties for medals were broken with a shoot-off.

Records

Prior to the competition, the existing world and Olympic records were as follows.

The top four shooters in 1956 exceeded the Olympic record, with the fifth-place man equaling it. Ștefan Petrescu ended with the new record, winning the event with 587 points.

Schedule

Results

Linnosvuo "was not prepared for the tie-break, and was only found in a barbershop."

References

Shooting at the 1956 Summer Olympics
Men's 1956